Aspergillus baarnensis is a species of fungus in the genus Aspergillus.

References

baarnensis
Fungi described in 2014